Siever is a surname. Notable people with the surname include:

 Ed Siever (1877–1920), American baseball pitcher
 Paul Siever (born 1969), American football offensive lineman

See also
 Sievers
 Seaver